Al-Garah is a village in Al-Ahsa, in the Eastern Province of Saudi Arabia.

Jabal Al-Qarah 

It has many caves with very cool air inside. Unlike many caves, these were formed by subaerial weathering rather than dissolution, and as a result have a highly distinctive shape. The mountain attracts many people especially from nearby villages, and has been targeted for additional touristic development. Although there are no other hills for a considerable distance, Jabal Al-Qarah is an outlier of the larger Shedgum Plateau.

The caves, which include 28 tall linear passageways totaling  in length, have long been a site of commerce. Some caves of Jabl Al-Garah have traditionally been the site of the workshops of local traditional potters, who are known for the quality of their wares.

References

See also 
 Eastern Arabia

Al-Ahsa Governorate
Populated places in Eastern Province, Saudi Arabia